Kidson may refer to:

Surname
Kidson (surname)

Geography
Kisdon Force, series of waterfalls on the River Swale in Swaledale, England
Kidson Island, island 28 km north-northeast of Byrd Head, Antarctica
Cape Kidson, abrupt rock scarp on the north side of the entrance to New Bedford Inlet, Palmer Land, Antarctica
Kidson Weir, on the Klip river in South Africa

See also
Kidsongs